Linda Hulin is a lecturer in Archaeology in Magdalen College, Oxford, a research officer at the Oxford Centre for Maritime Archaeology and a Supernumerary Fellow of Harris Manchester College, Oxford. Her focus of research is in the eastern Mediterranean in the second and first millennia BC, which includes the archaeology of Cyprus, the Levant, Egypt and Libya.

Hulin is director of the Western Marmarica Coastal Survey in Libya. 
She is editor of the Palestine Exploration Quarterly, the journal of the Palestine Exploration Fund.

Selected publications

References

External links 
 Official webpage
 BBC Radio 4, In Our Time The Bronze Age Collapse link, 2016. Linda Hulin on the panel with John Bennet and Simon Stoddart.

British women historians
Fellows of Harris Manchester College, Oxford
Academics of the University of Oxford
Living people
British women archaeologists
Year of birth missing (living people)